Homer Township, Ohio, may refer to:

Homer Township, Medina County, Ohio
Homer Township, Morgan County, Ohio

Ohio township disambiguation pages